Monster is the fourth studio album by Canadian-American rock band Steppenwolf. The album was released in November 1969, by ABC Dunhill Records. It was their first LP with new lead guitarist Larry Byrom instead of Michael Monarch. The album was Steppenwolf's most political album, making references to important issues at the time, such as the Vietnam War.

The album was the first Steppenwolf album not to feature a US top ten hit, though two singles from the album entered the top 40: "Move Over" and "Monster".

Reception
Reviews for Monster have generally been negative. Rolling Stone commented that the playing of the individual performers is "top-notch", but that "[t]heir arrangements have become sloppy and crude, as the early-Zappa lyrics continuously clash with the music."

AllMusic panned the album in their retrospective review, remarking that "these lumbering hard rock tunes were not an effective means to address [important political topics], politically or musically."

On the other hand, Village Voice critic Robert Christgau  gave the album praise. Christgau gave the album a B+ rating and called it "an excellent comeback", though he thought the preachy lyrics marred somewhat the final result.

Track listing

Personnel

Steppenwolf
 John Kay – vocals, harmonica, guitar
 Larry Byrom – lead guitar
 Nick St. Nicholas – bass guitar
 Goldy McJohn – Hammond organ, piano
 Jerry Edmonton – drums and lead vocals on "What Would You Do (If I Did That To You)"

Technical
 Gabriel Mekler – producer
 Bill Cooper – engineer
 Richard Podolor – engineer

Charts

Album

Singles

References

1969 albums
Steppenwolf (band) albums
ABC Records albums
Albums produced by Gabriel Mekler
Dunhill Records albums